A by-election was held in the Dáil Éireann Mayo West constituency in Ireland on 9 June 1994. It followed the resignation of Fianna Fáil Teachta Dála (TD) Pádraig Flynn after being appointed a European Commissioner.

The election was won by Fine Gael Mayo County Councillor and future Minister Michael Ring.

Among the candidates were Pádraig Flynn's daughter, Beverley Cooper Flynn and Jerry Cowley, both of whom would go on to serve as TDs, as well as Mayo County Councillor Johnny Mee.

On the same day, a by-election took place in Dublin South-Central.

Result

See also
List of Dáil by-elections
Dáil constituencies

References

External links
https://www.electionsireland.org/result.cfm?election=1992B&cons=177
http://irelandelection.com/election.php?elecid=147&constitid=22&electype=2

1994 in Irish politics
27th Dáil
By-elections in the Republic of Ireland
Elections in County Mayo
June 1994 events in Europe
1994 Mayo West by-election